Asthenotricha costalis is a moth in the family Geometridae first described by Per Olof Christopher Aurivillius in 1910. It is found in Kenya and Tanzania.

References

Moths described in 1910
Asthenotricha
Insects of Tanzania
Moths of Africa